Songlines Live is the seventh album and second commercially released live recording and first DVD by American jam band The Derek Trucks Band, released in 2006 (see 2006 in music).  It was recorded at the Park West in Chicago, Illinois.

Reception
In a review for All About Jazz Doug Collette stated that, on the DVD, the band "demonstrates what a wide vocabulary they possess, musically and intellectually, and how articulate they are in its use." He commented: "their stage presence is the natural theatre of serious musicians, intent on playing together in a way that maximizes the rapport they've built up over the years... it's clear they love to listen and watch one another, feeding ideas back and forth to enliven they playing."

Track listing
 Band interview introduction – 4:05
"Joyful Noise" (Burbridge/Trucks/Smallie/Scott/Colon) – 8:31
"Crow Jane" (Public domain) – 5:51
"Sahib Teri Bandi/Maki Madni" (Khan) – 10:38
"Volunteered Slavery" (Kirk) – 2:19
"I'll Find My Way" (Trucks/Joyce) – 4:44
"I Wish I Knew (How It Would Feel To Be Free)" (Taylor/Dallas) – 6:19
"Key To The Highway" (Broonzy/Segar) – 6:33
"I'd Rather Be Blind, Crippled and Crazy" (Carter/Hodges/Robey) – 6:40
"All I Do" (Trucks/Mattison/Smallie/Scott/Burbridge) – 5:45
"Mahjoun/Greensleeves" (Trucks)/(Traditional) – 9:59
"Sailing On" (Hibbert) – 5:10
"Chevrolet" (Young/Young) – 3:42
"Soul Serenade" (Dixon/Curtis) – 5:15
"For My Brother" (Trucks/Mattison/Smallie/Scott/Burbridge) – 9:04
"Feel So Bad" (Hopkins) – 7:39
"Let's Go Get Stoned" (Armstead/Ashford/Simpson) – 4:39
"Voices Inside (Everything Is Everything)/Fat Mama" (Evans/Powell/Upchurch)/(Hancock) – 11:04
"Anyday" (Clapton/Whitlock) – 7:54
"Maybe Your Baby" (Wonder) – 7:01
"Up Above My Head" (Tharpe) – 5:42

Personnel
Kofi Burbridge - keyboards, flute, vocals
Count M'Butu - congas, percussion
Mike Mattison - lead vocals
Yonrico Scott - drums, percussion, backing vocals
Todd Smallie - bass, backing vocals
Derek Trucks - guitar

Production and crew
Executive Producers: Blake Budney, John Carlo Vernile
Director: Hank Lena
Producer: Evan Haiman
Live Sound Engineer: Marty Wall
Tour Manager: Chris Edwards
Stage Manager/Technician: Bobby Tis
Editor: Ray Volkema
Audio Mixing: Jay Joyce, Mike Paragone
Audio Engineering: Mike Konopka
Audio Mastering: Andrew Mendelson
Audio Finishing: John "Digger" Peleaz
Lighting Director: Brad Mackie
Lighting Programmer: William "IGGY" Ingoglia
Coach Operator: Bobby Bolton
Management Assistant: Nicole Lund
Set Designer: Jeff Wood
Stylist: Julie Orlin
Associate Producer: Sarah Iversen
Booking: Wayne Forte
Management: Blake Budney
Art Direction/Design: Josh Cheuse
Photography: Adam Farber
Bonus Footage Interview Editing: Marc Ryan
Bonus Footage Provided By: Marty Shulman

References

Derek Trucks live albums
Live video albums
2006 live albums
2006 video albums